Plesiornis, whose name means "nearly bird", is an ichnogenus of dinosaur footprint that slightly (although superficially) resemble bird footprints.

See also

 List of dinosaur ichnogenera

References

Dinosaur trace fossils
Theropods